World Championship Snooker 2002 is a sports video game developed by Blade Interactive and published by Codemasters exclusively for PlayStation 2.

Overview
Following on from its predecessor, graphical and textural implementations have been improved. The game offers the ability to set a "handicap" when playing against an AI opponent, or a friend, whilst also offering the ability to change the AI's difficulty level. There are aiming and potting "aids", to help the player, with a virtual line on screen displaying the line that the  would take

Reception

World Championship Snooker 2002 received "mixed or average" reviews, according to review aggregator GameRankings.

References

External links

2001 video games
Europe-exclusive video games
PlayStation 2 games
PlayStation 2-only games
2002
Video games developed in the United Kingdom